The Socialist Workers and Peasants Party of Latvia was a political party in Latvia. The party was an illegal underground party, formed in 1934 by the left-wing sector of the Latvian Social Democratic Workers Party after the ban on parties following the coup of Kārlis Ulmanis.

The party was closely aligned with the Communist Party of Latvia. In November 1934 the two parties signed an agreement of unity in action against fascism. In 1936 the youth organizations of the two parties merged into the Workers Youth League of Latvia. In 1939 an anti-fascist popular front was formed, with the Communist Party, the Socialist Workers and Peasants Party and the Workers Youth League as its main constituents.

The party was disbanded in July 1940 after the Soviet occupation of the Baltic states.

References

Defunct political parties in Latvia
Political parties established in 1934
Socialist parties in Latvia